KKNB may refer to:

 KKNB-LP, a low-power radio station (92.7 FM) licensed to serve Kanab, Utah, United States
 KIBZ, a radio station (104.1 FM) licensed to serve Crete, Nebraska, United States, which held the call sign KKNB from 1988 to 2001
 Kanab Municipal Airport (ICAO code KKNB)